José Elías Moreno (12 November 1910 – 15 July 1969) was a Mexican character actor. He appeared in more than 180 films between 1937 and 1969. He was from the state of Jalisco. His son of the same name, born in 1956, is also a successful actor in television, cinema, and stage.

Early life
Moreno was born José Elías Moreno Padilla in the small town of Las Palmas, municipality of Unión de San Antonio, at six in the morning on 12 November 1910. His parents were Ignacio Moreno Padilla and María Padilla Hurtado.

Selected filmography

 Such Is My Country (1937) (uncredited)
 Heads or Tails (1937) as extra
 Wild Flower (1943)
 Porfirio Díaz (1944)
 The White Monk (1945)
 Tragic Wedding (1946)
 I Am a Fugitive (1946)
 Symphony of Life (1946)
 Angels of the Arrabal (1949)
 Midnight (1949)
 The Perez Family (1949) as Toribio Sánchez
 Cuatro contra el mundo (1950) as Comandante Canseco
 Las Tres perfectas casadas (1953) as Máximo
 Luz en el páramo (1953) as José
 The Boxer (1958)
 Una cita de amor (1958) as Juez de 
 Santa Claus (1959) as Santa Claus
 Invincible Guns (1960)
 Caperucita y Pulgarcito contra los monstruos (1962) as Ogre
 El padrecito (1964) as Don Silvestre Manzanos
 Viento Negro (film) (1965) as Lorenzo Montes
 La Valentina (1966) as Don Juan Zúñiga
 Rage (1966) as Fortunato
 The Partisan of Villa (1967)

References

External links

1910 births
1969 deaths
Mexican male film actors
Road incident deaths in Mexico
Golden Age of Mexican cinema
Male actors from Jalisco
20th-century Mexican male actors